This is a list of the main career statistics of the professional Slovak tennis player Dominika Cibulková.

Performance timelines
Only main-draw results in WTA Tour, Grand Slam tournaments, Fed Cup and Olympic Games are included in win–loss records.

Singles

Doubles

Significant finals

Grand Slam finals

Singles: 1 (1 runner-up)

WTA Tour Championships finals

Singles: 1 (1 title)

WTA Premier Mandatory & 5 finals

Singles: 3 (3 runner-ups)

WTA career finals

Singles: 21 (8 titles, 13 runner-ups)

Doubles: 3 (1 title, 2 runner-ups)

Team competitions: 1 (1 title)

ITF Circuit finals

Singles: 6 (2 titles, 4 runner-ups)

Doubles: 1 (1 runner–up)

WTA Tour career earnings 
Cibulková earned more than 13 million dollars during her career.

Career Grand Slam statistics

Grand Slam tournament seedings 
The tournaments won by Cibulková are in boldface, and advanced into finals by Cibulková are in italics.

Singles

Best Grand Slam results details

Fed Cup participation
This table shows Cibulková's participation for Slovakia Fed Cup team up to 17, April 2016.

Source: fedcup.com

Singles (20–11)

Doubles (1–8)

Record against other players

Record against top 10 players 
Cibulková's record against players who have been ranked in the top 10 (correct to 15 September 2022):

No. 1 wins

Top 10 wins

Notes

References

External links
 Official website
 
 

Cibulkova, Dominika